Nicomioides larvatus is a species of beetle in the family Cerambycidae, and the only species in the genus Nicomioides. It was described by Pascoe in 1878.

References

Apomecynini
Beetles described in 1878
Monotypic beetle genera